María Cecilia Vargas (born 28 October 1957) is a Mexican former backstroke swimmer. She competed in two events at the 1972 Summer Olympics.

References

External links
 

1957 births
Living people
Mexican female backstroke swimmers
Olympic swimmers of Mexico
Swimmers at the 1972 Summer Olympics
Place of birth missing (living people)